The 1937 U.S. National Championships (now known as the US Open) was a tennis tournament that took place on the outdoor grass courts at the West Side Tennis Club, Forest Hills in New York City, United States. The tournament ran from 2 September until 11 September. It was the 57th staging of the U.S. National Championships and the fourth Grand Slam tennis event of the year.

Finals

Men's singles

 Don Budge defeated  Gottfried von Cramm  6–1, 7–9, 6–1, 3–6, 6–1

Women's singles

 Anita Lizana defeated  Jadwiga Jędrzejowska  6–4, 6–2

Men's doubles
 Gottfried von Cramm /  Henner Henkel defeated  Don Budge /  Gene Mako 6–4, 7–5, 6–4

Women's doubles
 Sarah Palfrey Cooke /  Alice Marble defeated  Marjorie Gladman Van Ryn /  Carolin Babcock 7–5, 6–4

Mixed doubles
 Sarah Palfrey Cooke /  Don Budge defeated  Sylvie Jung Henrotin /  Yvon Petra 6–2, 8–10, 6–0

References

External links
Official US Open website

 
U.S. National Championships
U.S. National Championships (tennis) by year
U.S. National Championships
U.S. National Championships
U.S. National Championships